Northern Arizona is an unofficial, colloquially-defined region of the U.S. state of Arizona. Generally consisting of Apache, Coconino, Mohave, Navajo, and Gila counties, the region is geographically dominated by the Colorado Plateau, the southern border of which in Arizona is called the Mogollon Rim.

Demographics 
Flagstaff is the largest city in northern Arizona. Other cities include Prescott, Sedona, Page, and Williams.

Much of the territory is National Forest Service land, parkland, or other BLM-administered lands. In the north-east are large Hopi and Navajo reservations, parts of which overlap, leading to occasional territorial disputes. Native Americans make up 48% of the population in Coconino County, Navajo County, and Apache County. Ruins of the ancient Anasazi, Sinagua, and other Puebloan people can be found in northern Arizona.

Most northern Arizonians attend Northern Arizona University, with 66% being Arizona residents.

Geography 

The region features several mountain ranges, including the state's highest, the San Francisco Peaks. It also contains most of the state's natural lakes. In the east lies the White Mountain range. The Grand Canyon is in the west.  The central portion of northern Arizona has the Painted Desert.

The area is known for its rugged landscape and variety of environment. Northern Arizona is home to millions of acres of Ponderosa Pine, Aspen, and mixed-conifer forests, including the largest Ponderosa Pine forest in North America. Attractions in addition to the Grand Canyon include Monument Valley, Canyon de Chelly, the Painted Desert, and Meteor Crater. The major highway is Interstate 40 (roughly following the historic Route 66) which connects the larger cities of this region. Northern Arizona also goes by the name Alta Arizona, which means "Upper Arizona" in Spanish. Northern Arizona has a large Mormon population, with a temple in Snowflake.

Northern Arizona consists of four different counties:
 Mohave County
 Coconino County
 Navajo County
 Apache County

Northern Arizona has various points of interest. The area is known for its variety of outdoor recreation opportunities, hiking trails and forest service roads, extreme topographical and environmental variability, and its geologic and human history. The following is a list of popular attractions in northern Arizona.

National Parks and Monuments
 Grand Canyon National Park
 Petrified Forest National Park
 Canyon de Chelly National Monument
 Grand Canyon-Parashant National Monument
 Navajo National Monument
 Sunset Crater Volcano National Monument
 Walnut Canyon National Monument
 Wupatki National Monument
 Vermillion Cliffs National Monument

Natural attractions
 Monument Valley
 Painted Desert
 Oak Creek Canyon
 Slide Rock State Park
 San Francisco Peaks
 Red Rock Country
 Lava River Cave
 San Francisco Volcanic Field
 Window Rock
 Antelope Canyon

Other attractions
 Arizona Snowbowl
 Lowell Observatory
 Grand Canyon Railway
 Museum of Northern Arizona
 Northern Arizona University
 Four Corners Monument
 Jerome

Subregions

Northeast Arizona 
Northeast Arizona commonly includes Apache County and Navajo County. Some notable towns there are St. Johns, Eagar, Holbrook, Show Low, Winslow, Window Rock, Fort Defiance, Ganado, Chinle, and Kayenta.

It is the location of several Indian reservations including all of the Zuni Indian Reservation and most parts of the Hopi Reservation, the Navajo Nation, and the Fort Apache Indian Reservation. The rugged desert landscape of Northeast Arizona has been inhabited by indigenous peoples since at least the construction of what are now the ruins at Monument Valley, Navajo National Monument, and Canyon de Chelly National Monument.

Northeast Arizona is arid, largely free of greenery, and characterized by hills, mesas, buttes, cliffs, and canyons. The windy stony plains of the Petrified Forest National Park exhibits parts of the barren colorful Painted Desert as well as preserved Native American petroglyphs. Northeast Arizona is also home to the Apache-Sitgreaves National Forest and Four Corners Monument.

North central Arizona

Arizona Strip 
The Arizona Strip is the segment of Arizona to the north of the Colorado River. Geographically isolated from the rest of the state, it has fewer than 10,000 people.

See also 

 Arizona Trail

References

Geography of Arizona